This is a list of cancelled games for the X68000.

List 
There are currently  games on this list.

See also 
 List of X68000 games
 Lists of video games

Notes

References 

X68000